Golborne David is a civil parish in Cheshire West and Chester, England.  It contains five buildings that are recorded in the National Heritage List for England as designated listed buildings, all of which are at Grade II.   This grade is the lowest of the three gradings given to listed buildings and is applied to "buildings of national importance and special interest".  The parish is entirely rural, the listed buildings consisting of two farmhouses, a barn, a bridge, and a boundary stone.

See also
Listed buildings in Aldford
Listed buildings in Golborne Bellow
Listed buildings in Handley
Listed buildings in Hargrave
Listed buildings in Huxley
Listed buildings in Saighton
Listed buildings in Tattenhall

References

Listed buildings in Cheshire West and Chester
Lists of listed buildings in Cheshire